TPI Specialties is the name of an auto parts manufacturer specializing in air induction and fuel delivery parts, with a particular emphasis on GM Tuned Port Injection applications.

History
TPI Specialties was founded by Myron Cottrell, a professional engine builder, who had bought a new Chevrolet Corvette in 1985 and was intrigued by the potential for improvement in its Tuned Port Injection fuel injection system.  Once Cottrell had sufficiently learned the intricacies of the system, he began producing aftermarket parts intended to improve power production by these engines.  Today Cottrell is considered an authority on the subject of automotive fuel injection systems.

Products
 Fuel Flow Regulators
 Intake Manifolds
 Fuel Injector Manifolds
 Fuel Injectors
 Throttle Bodies
 Headers
 Camshafts
 Cylinder Heads
 Suspension Components

Market
Today TPI Specialties presents itself as a market leader in the field of aftermarket fuel injection systems, and is frequently referenced as such in such publications as Hot Rod Magazine and Car Craft magazine.

External links
Company website

Notes

Automotive motorsports and performance companies
DIY culture
Companies based in Minnesota